Tony Bell, Antony Bell or Anthony Bell may refer to:

Tony Bell (Antony Bell, born 1958), British journalist
Tony Bell (physicist) (Anthony Raymond Bell, fl. from 1977), British physicist
Anthony Bell (director) (also known as Tony Bell, born 1970), American animator, film director and screenwriter
Anthony Bell (Anthony Dewitt Bell, born 1964), American footballer